Športno društvo NK Križevci, commonly referred to as NK Križevci or simply Križevci, is a Slovenian football club from Križevci which competes in the 1. MNL, the fifth highest football league in Slovenia. The team was founded in 1963.

Honours
Slovenian Third League
 Winners: 2001–02

Slovenian Fourth Division
 Winners: 2014–15, 2017–18

League history since 1996

References

Association football clubs established in 1963
Football clubs in Slovenia
1963 establishments in Slovenia